Richard Fall (3 April 1882 – January 1945) was an Austrian composer and conductor of Jewish descent. One of his most famous compositions is the popular Was machst du mit dem Knie lieber Hans.

Life 

Born in Jevíčko, Österreich-Ungarn, Fall grew up in a family of musicians. His two brothers Leo and Siegfried as well as his father were also composers and conductors. Fall worked as operettas conductor in Berlin and Vienna and as film composer in Hollywood.

After the Anschluss (1938), he fled National Socialism to France.

On 20 November 1943 he was deported from the Drancy internment camp to the KZ Auschwitz-Birkenau, where he died early in January 1945, before the liberation of the concentration camp.

Works

Stage plays 
Goldreifchen. Fairy tale in 3 acts. Libretto:  and Mia Ewers. UA 1909 Vienna
Das Damenparadies. Operetta in one act. Libretto: Julius Brammer and Alfred Grünwald. UA 1911 Vienna
Wiener Fratz. Operetta in one act. UA 1912 Vienna
Arms and the Girl. Operetta in 2 scenes, Libretto: Austen Hurgon. UA 1912 London
Leute vom Stand. Operetta in one act. Libretto: Robert Bodanzky and Fritz Grünbaum. UA 1913 Vienna
Der Weltenbummler. Operetta in one prelude and 2 acts. Libretto: Fritz Löhner-Beda and Karl Lindau. UA 1915 Berlin
Die Dame von Welt. Operetta in 3 acts. Libretto: Fritz Löhner-Beda and Hans Kottow. UA 1917 Vienna
Die Puppenbaronessen. Musical comedy in 2 acts. Libretto: Alexander Engel and Fritz Grünbaum. UA 1917 Vienna
Großstadtmärchen. Operetta in 3 acts. UA 1920 Vienna
Im Alpenhotel. Operetta in one act. Libretto: Julius Horst and Ernst Wengraf. UA 1921 Vienna
Der geizige Verschwender. Operetta in 3 acts. UA 1922 Berlin
Apollo? Nur Apollo! Revue in 18 scenes (together with other composers). Libretto: Fritz Grünbaum,  and Fritz Löhner-Beda. UA 1925 Vienna
Hallo! Hier Grünbaum! Revue. Text: Fritz Grünbaum. UA 1927 Vienna

Songs 
Junger Mann, text: Arthur Rebner. 1923. Verlag Gabor Steiner, N.Y. 
Liebe Katharina, komm zu mir nach China! Lied and Foxtrot. Text: Fritz Löhner-Beda. 1927. Wiener Bohême Verlag
Meine Tante, deine Tante. One-step, text: Fritz Löhner-Beda. 1925. Wiener Bohême Verlag
Was machst du mit dem Knie, lieber Hans. Pasodoble, text: Fritz Löhner-Beda. 1925. Wiener Bohême Verlag
Wenn man’s noch nie gemacht. Foxtrot, text: Arthur Rebner. 1923. Verlag Gabor Steiner, N.Y.
Wo sind deine Haare, August? Foxtrot, text: Fritz Löhner-Beda

Bibliography 
 Kay Weniger: Zwischen Bühne und Baracke. Lexikon der verfolgten Theater-, Film- und Musikkünstler 1933 bis 1945. With an introduction by Paul Spiegel. Metropol, Berlin 2008, .

References

External links 
 
 Richard Fall on Lexm.uni-hamburg
 
 Richard Fall on musiques-regenerees.fr

1882 births
1945 deaths
20th-century classical composers
20th-century Austrian conductors (music)
20th-century Austrian male musicians
Austrian film score composers
Austrian operetta composers
Austrian people who died in Auschwitz concentration camp
Male conductors (music)
Male film score composers
People from Jevíčko
Austrian Jews who died in the Holocaust